"In Plenty and In Time of Need" is the national anthem of the country of Barbados. It was written by Irving Burgie and was composed by C. Van Roland Edwards. As one part of the West Indies Federation from 1958 to 1962, Barbados' anthem was supposed to be "Forged from the Love of Liberty" (which is currently the national anthem of Trinidad and Tobago), however the current anthem was created with Barbados's moves toward full independence. The song was then adopted by Barbados when it became independent in 1966.

History 
The anthem was composed by C. Van Roland Edwards (1912–1985). Edwards, a composer who was partially blind, was assisted by his daughters Nannette and Eullia in his composition of "In Plenty and In Time of Need". The lyrics were written by Irving Burgie (1924–2019), a musician from Brooklyn, New York City, born to a Barbadian mother and an American father. A committee made up of Bruce St. John, Frank Collymore, Enid Lynch, George Lamming, Gerald Hudson and John Fletcher selected Edwards's composition as the national anthem, and Edwards was awarded BDS$500.

The anthem was first performed on Independence Day, on 30 November 1966. In 1967, the anthem's music was rearranged by Inspector Prince Cave of the Royal Barbados Police Band, giving it a more sustained harmony while retaining the original tune.

Lyrics

Rules regarding anthem 
The Government of Barbados outlines the following rules for the National Anthem:

Conduct during play 
1. Whenever the National Anthem is played all civilians present should stand at attention, men with bared heads. Persons in uniform should act in accordance with instructions.

Anthem application 

2. Normally one verse only and the chorus will be played. Where a shortened version of the National Anthem is played, it shall consist of the first twelve bars of the verse and the last four bars of the chorus.

The National Anthem shall be played: 
(a) for the purposes of a salute on ceremonial or official occasions, on the arrival and departure of:
(i) the President of Barbados.
(ii) a foreign Sovereign, Head of State or member of a reigning foreign imperial or Royal Family,
(iii) Governors-General of Independent Commonwealth countries.
(iv) Governors of the Associated States, and
(v) Governors, High Commissioners of Officers administering the Government of a dependent territory within the Commonwealth
(b) at the beginning of all public performances in a cinema house.

3. The National Anthem may be played
(a) at the completion of any public function, or
(b) when toasts are proposed at official functions.

Rules in usage 
4. The National Anthem should not be parodied in verse or in song neither should it be played in any tempo other than that officially recognized (eighty-eight crotchets to the minute). Particularly, the tune should not be used as a dance number or for the purposes of advertisement.

5. When more than one anthem is played the Barbados anthem should be played last.

See also 
 National symbols of Barbados

References

External links 
Streaming audio of the national anthem of Barbados, with information and lyrics (archive link)
Vocal - Other format
Barbadian National Anthem MIDI Instrumental
Video - YouTube video of National Anthem with scenes of Barbados
Version as played by the Royal Barbados Police Force Band (RBPF)

National symbols of Barbados
Barbadian songs
Barbados
National anthems
National anthem compositions in G major